Pick Lake is a lake in Thunder Bay District, Ontario, Canada. The primary outflow is an unnamed creek to an unnamed lake on the Whitesand River, between Demijohn Lake and Gumboot Lake.

References

Lakes of Thunder Bay District